Héctor Ortega Gómez (12 January 1939 — 3 June 2020) was a Mexican film, television, and theater actor. He was also a screenwriter and a director.

Early life 
In 1967 Ortega and María Asunción Stoupignan had a son, Damián Ortega, an artist who began his career as a cartoonist in the newspaper, La Jornada.

Career 
Ortega's early work as an actor was primarily in the theatrical field, his first work as an actor was in the film There are no thieves in this village (En este pueblo no hay ladrones) 1964 in which he portrayed an effeminate waiter. After his film debut he appeared in a multitude of films that include Los días del amor, La montaña sagrada, El hombre del puente.

He has appeared in many telenovelas, among them were: Colorina, Cicatrices del alma, Cenizas y diamantes, La última esperanza, La sombra del otro, El privilegio de amar, Mi destino eres tú, Aventuras en el tiempo, Alegrijes y rebujos, La verdad oculta and Querida enemiga.

Ortega has also had an extensive career in theater, both acting and directing.

He has appeared in productions such as ¡Ay Cuauhtémoc no te rajes!, El huevo de Colón, works that he also directed; and in 1822: El año que fuimos imperio for which he received the Best Actor Award by the Mexican Association of Theater Critics (Asociación Mexicana de Críticos Teatrales). He directed works such as Silencio: locos trabajando in which Mexican acting legends such as Héctor Suárez, Fernando Luján, Martha Navarro and Susana Alexander also participated. He directed the theater production Ensalada de locos with Manuel "El Loco" Valdés, Héctor Lechuga and Alejandro Suárez, as well as The accidental death of an anarchist (La muerte accidental de un anarquista) 1983 which was one of the most important works of his career, a production that he also appeared in.

He has also stood out as a scriptwriter and playwright, together with Alfonso Arau, Francisco Córdova and Emilio Carballido he co-wrote the original plot and screenplay for El aguila descalza in 1969. Working together with Arau , Alfonso de la Cabada and the caricaturist Eduardo del Río "Rius", and the comic book Los supermachos for the film Calzonzin Inspector in 1973. In 1976 for the film Cuartelazo, he wrote the original plot and together with Alberto Isaac and María Antonieta Domínguez wrote the screenplay.

In 1976 Ortega made his directing film debut with La palomilla al rescate. The following year he directed his second film Vacaciones misteriosas.

Union of Cinema Production Workers 
In April 1994 Ortega was elected General Secretariat of the Central Committee of the Union of Cinema Production Workers, a four-year position that would last only 10 months. He had been part of the union for 17 years (STPC), a union comprised not only of people who work in cinema, but theater, night clubs and clowns as well. Ortega was dismissed in January 1995 after being accused by a sector of the union of a lack of commitment to its members.

In 2012 Ortega participated in the Bellas Artes reading promotional program "Leo… luego existo" (I read, therefore I exist) at the El Cubo in the Tijuana Cultural Center, where he read from his book "Revistas políticas" (Political Magazines).

Filmography

Film 
{| class="wikitable sortable"
|+ Film roles
|-
! Year !! Title !! Role !! Notes
|-
| 1965
| There Are No Thieves in This Village
| Mesero
|
|-
| 1971
| El águila descalza
| Factory worker / Transit police
|
|-
| 1971
| Pubertinaje
|
| (segment "Una cena de navidad")
|-
| 1972
| Los días del amor
| General Terrazas
|
|-
| 1972
| The Garden of Aunt Isabel
|
|
|-
| 1972
| El vals sin fin
| Francisco Madero
|
|-
| 1972
| El rincón de las vírgenes
| Gobernador
|
|-
| 1972
| Los cacos
|
|
|-
| 1973
| The Holy Mountain
| Drug Master
|
|-
| 1973
| El premio Nobel del amor
|
|
|-
| 1973
| Those Years
| Estrada
|
|-
| 1973
| El profeta Mimi
| Padre de Mimi
|
|-
| 1974
| Cinco mil dólares de recompensa
|
|
|-
| 1974
| Calzonzin Inspector
| Periodista
|
|-
| 1975
| Tívoli
| Lic. Félix Pantoja
|
|-
| 1975
| Las fuerzas vivas
| Leandro
|
|-
| 1976
| El hombre del puente
| Secretario del presidente
|
|-
| 1976
| La palomilla al rescate
|
| Uncredited
|-
| 1977
| Cuartelazo
| Belisarío Domínguez
|
|-
| 1978
| Duro pero seguro
| Periodista
|
|-
| 1979
| Adriana del Río, actriz
|
|
|-
| 1981
| Cuentos de Principes y Princesas
|
|
|-
| 1986
| Outra Vez
|
|
|-
| 1987
| Mariana, Mariana
| Priest
|
|-
| 1987
| Herencia maldita
|
|
|-
| 1987
| El misterio de la casa abandonada
| Librero
|
|-
| 1988
| Punto de arroz
|
| Short
|-
| 1989
| El costo de la vida
|
|
|-
| 1989
| Santa sangre
| Doctor
|
|-
| 1990
| ¡Maten a Chinto!
| Inés
|
|-
| 1990
| Tú decides sobre el sida
|
| Short
|-
| 1991
| La leyenda de una máscara
| Juan J. Luna
|
|-
| 1993
| Fray Bartolomé de las Casas
| Emperador Carlos V
|
|-
| 1995
| Algunas nubes
| Writer
|
|-
| 1995
| 'Mujeres insumisas| Urtiz
|
|-
| 1996
| Cuestión de gustos| Tío Eustaquio
| Short
|-
| 1999
| Las delicias del poder| Santos Barboza
|
|-
| 1999
| La paloma de Marsella|
|
|-
| 2000
| Por la libre| Felipe
|
|-
| 2001
| Otaola o la república del exilio| Indalecio
|
|-
| 2002
| Francisca|
|
|-
| 2003
| Lucía, Lucía| The Cannibal
|
|-
| 2003
| La hija del caníbal| El Caníbal
|
|-
| 2006
| El Cobrador: In God We Trust| Periodista 1
|
|-
| 2010
| No eres tú, soy yo| Edmundo
|
|}

 Telenovelas 

 TV series 

 Awards and nominations 
 Mexican Association of Theater Critics – Best Actor Award for 1822: El Año en que Fuimos Imperio in 2002
 Ariel Award – Best Picture Award for Mariana, Mariana in 1987
 19th Ariel Awards – Best Actor Nomination for Cuartelazo in 1977
 15th Ariel Awards – Best Supporting Actor Nomination for El Rincón de las Vírgenes as Gobernador in 1972
 Ariel Award – Best Original Story for El águila descalza in 1972
 Ariel Award - Best Picture for El águila descalza in 1972

 Stage 
 Para leer Cien años de Soledad 2008, Ortega also directed
 1822, el año que fuimos imperio 1996

 Bibliography 

2006 – Revistas Políticas. Las últimas revistas cómico políticas del siglo y del milenio1994 - El cómico proceso de José K.: adaptación de la obra El proceso de Franz Kafka''

References

External links 
 

20th-century Mexican male actors
21st-century Mexican male actors
1939 births
Mexican film directors
2020 deaths